Lionel Benedict Nicolson  (6 August 1914 – 22 May 1978) was a British art historian and author.

Nicolson was the elder son of authors Harold Nicolson and Vita Sackville-West and the brother of writer and politician Nigel. His godmothers were Violet Trefusis, Olive Custance and Rosamund Grosvenor.

The boys grew up at Sissinghurst Castle, in the rural depths of Kent, surrounded by the renowned gardens that are now run by the National Trust.  Nicolson was educated at Eton College and Balliol College, Oxford, studying modern history. In 1939, he was appointed Deputy Surveyor of the King's Pictures under Kenneth Clark, but soon after, war was declared and he joined the Intelligence Corps, rising to the rank of captain. In 1945 he resumed his Royal post as Deputy Surveyor, then under Anthony Blunt.

He was married on 8 August 1955 to Luisa Vertova, the elder daughter of Professor Giacomo Vertova of Florence, and they had a daughter, Vanessa Pepita Giovanna (b. 1956), before divorcing in 1962.

After being appointed a MVO, Nicolson resigned from the Royal Household in 1947 and became editor of The Burlington Magazine (1947–1978). Nicolson spent much of his life collecting photographs of early seventeenth-century works in the Caravaggio manner which he wrote about in The Burlington Magazine and which eventually filled three large volumes.

Nicolson died in 1978 and was buried in Trinity Church Cemetery in Sissinghurst, Kent, adjacent to his father.

Archive & library 
Nicolson's archive is in the Paul Mellon Centre where it is fully catalogued and available for consultation. The archive includes material created and collected by Nicolson, largely in a personal rather than professional capacity, throughout his life. The majority pertains to 1933–1939. The collection primarily includes journals and correspondence.

Ancestors

Works
The Painters of Ferrara (1950)
Hendrick Terbrugghen (1958)
Wright of Derby: Painter of Light (1968)
The Treasures of the Foundling Hospital (1972)
Courbet: The Studio of the Painter (1973)
Georges de La Tour (1974)

References

Sources
Playing by the Rules - Kennedy Fraser
Dictionary of Art Historians

External links 

 Benedict Nicolson archive at the Paul Mellon Centre

See also
 List of Bloomsbury Group people

1914 births
1978 deaths
English art historians
Intelligence Corps officers
English LGBT writers
Members of the Royal Victorian Order
Benedict
People educated at Eton College
20th-century English historians
20th-century English LGBT people